Maganlal Khushalchand Gandhi (1883–1928) was a follower of Mohandas Gandhi. He was a first cousin, twice removed, of Mahatma Gandhi. 

Maganlal Gandhi is cited in many works of Mahatma Gandhi. It is he who suggested that the word Satyagraha should define Gandhi's nonviolence methods. According to Gandhi, Maganlal was the heart and soul of Sabarmati Ashram. He followed Gandhi in South Africa in 1903 "in the hope of making a bit of fortune." However, he ended up following his uncle's self-imposed poverty and joined the Phoenix Settlement.

Gandhi died of typhoid at Patna on 23 April 1928.

References
Maganlal Gandhi
Gandhi Family tree

Maganlal
Gandhians
Deaths from typhoid fever
1883 births
1928 deaths
People from Patna
Expatriates from British India in South Africa